is a Japanese musician and fashion model best known as the lead vocalist for new wave band Plastics who then went on to form Melon with Plastics bandmate Toshio Nakanishi. The duo became a prominent fixture in the Tokyo club and fashion scenes, serving as trendsetters responsible for bringing British, American new wave, graffiti, and hip-hop to Japan.

References

Year of birth missing (living people)
Living people
Japanese women pop singers
Japanese electronic musicians
Japanese synth-pop musicians
New wave musicians
Musicians from Harajuku